Canty Bay is a small inlet and coastal hamlet on the northern coast of East Lothian, Scotland. Other settlements nearby include Auldhame, Scoughall, Seacliff, and the Peffer Sands.

The Glen Golf Club is close to its western side, and to the east there are high coastal cliffs. There are two beaches separated by a rocky headland. The western beach is uninhabited and accessible by two paths that descend the grass-covered cliffs from the eastern end of the Glen golf course. The eastern beach is by the hamlet.

This former fishing hamlet has been immortalised by William McGonagall in his poem Beautiful North Berwick and its surroundings. The Canty Bay Inn offered hospitality to the tourists who came to see the Bass Rock. The tenant of the Rock was usually also the innkeeper.

The William Edgar Evans Charitable Trust maintains a house and two cottages for use by Scout and Guide troops.

Dolphins can be seen at Canty Bay and from the Scottish Seabird Centre.

See also
List of places in East Lothian

References

External links

SCRAN image of Canty Bay, North Berwick
CANMORE/RCAHMS record of Canty Bay House, Archaeological Landscape
CANMORE/RCAHMS record of Castleton Farm, Canty Bay Road
RCAHMS record of North Berwick, Canty Bay House
Scottish Seabird Centre: sightings of dolphins and whales
Evans Trust 
Scapetrust: Map 1: North Berwick to Canty Bay

Villages in East Lothian
Ports and harbours of Scotland
Hamlets in Scotland
North Berwick